Matthew Marks is an art gallery located in the New York City neighborhood of Chelsea and the Los Angeles neighborhood of West Hollywood. Founded in 1991 by Matthew Marks, it specializes in modern and contemporary painting, sculpture, photography, installation art, film, and drawings and prints. The gallery has three exhibition spaces in New York City and two in Los Angeles.

Artists
Matthew Marks represents numerous living artists, including:
 Darren Almond (since 2000)
 Nayland Blake (since 1993)
 Leidy Churchman (since 2018)
 Vija Celmins (since 2015)
 Alex Da Corte (since 2021)
 Trisha Donnelly (since 2015)
 Katharina Fritsch (since 1994)
 Robert Gober (since 2002) 
 Gary Hume (since 1991)
 Jasper Johns (since 2005)
 Simone Leigh (since 2021)
 Julien Nguyen (since 2019)
 Charles Ray (since 2006)
 Terry Winters (since 1996)
 Peter Fischli David Weiss (since 1998)

In addition, the gallery manages various artist estates, including: 
 Peter Cain
 Ellsworth Kelly (since 1992)
 Michel Majerus
 Ken Price (since 2002)
 Anne Truitt

In the past, the gallery has worked with the following artists and estates: 
 Nan Goldin (1992–2018)
 Andreas Gursky (1996–2010)
 Roni Horn (from 1992)
 Peter Hujar 
 Brice Marden (1991–2017)
 Tony Smith (until 2017)
 Hiroshi Sugimoto 
 Sam Taylor-Wood (from 2000)

History
Matthew Marks worked for the Pace Gallery in New York City and Anthony d'Offay in London prior to opening his own gallery.

After working for three years at d'Offay, Marks moved back to New York City to open his own gallery, a  space on Madison Avenue. The Matthew Marks Gallery had its first exhibition, Artists' Sketchbooks, in February 1991, including Louise Bourgeois, Francesco Clemente, Jackson Pollock, and Cy Twombly.

Matthew Marks Gallery opened its first space in Chelsea — a converted single-story garage with skylights at 522 West 22nd Street — in 1994, with a show of Ellsworth Kelly. In 1996, the gallery teamed up with two other galleries – Gladstone Gallery and Metro Pictures – to acquire and divide up a  warehouse at 515 West 24th Street. By 1997, the gallery closed its space on Madison Avenue. Over the following years, two more spaces in Chelsea were added.

Since 1998, Matthew Marks Gallery and another gallery—first Pat Hearn Gallery (1998), later Greene Naftali Gallery (2008, 2018)—have organized "Painting: Now and Forever", a large-scale, ongoing survey of contemporary painting, every 10 years.

In 2012, Matthew Marks Gallery opened two locations in West Hollywood, Los Angeles, both designed by Peter Zellner.

Marks is married to Jack Bankowsky, a former editor of Artforum magazine and art critic and curator.

The Armory Show 
In 1994, the Gramercy International Art Fair, now called The Armory Show, made its debut in New York's Gramercy Park Hotel. Four dealers and gallerists, Pat Hearn, Colin de Land, Matthew Marks and Paul Morris, worked together to bring in a younger generation of downtown artists who were working through the recession that plagued the 1980s. Mark Dion's Lemonade Stand (1996), Andrea Fraser’s Museum Highlights: A Gallery Talk (1989), May I Help You (1991), and Renée Green’s The Pigskin Library (1990) debuted at the art fair.

References

Further reading
Matthew Marks, l'homme pressé. Beaux Arts, November 1993, 40–41. 
The Print Collector's Newsletter, May–June 1991. 
Gimelson, Deborah. The Art of the Dealer. Mirabella, March 1992, 71–72.
Gubernick, Lisa. De Kooning's Uptown Upstart Art Dealer Slouches Toward Success Despite Slump. New York Observer, April 25, 1994. 
Kazanjian, Dodie. Marks and Sparks. Vogue, February 1995, 256–259, 296. 
Kennedy, Randy. Chelsea: The Art and Commerce of One Hot Block. The New York Times, November 3, 2006, sec E.
Mar, Alex.  Critics Pick: Matthew Marks. New York Magazine
Tröster, Christian. Ins Herz de Kunstler: Matthew Marks ist New Yorks neuer Stargalerist. German Vogue, April 1997
West, Kevin. Matthew's Mark. W, March 1997, 290–296
Yablonsky, Linda. Portrait of the Dealer as a Young Man. Out, November 1997.

External links

Matthew Marks Gallery at artnet.com

Contemporary art galleries in the United States
Art museums and galleries in Manhattan